The LOS40 Music Awards 2018 was the thirteenth edition of the LOS40 Music Awards, the annual awards organized by Spanish radio station Los 40. It was held on November 2, 2018 in the WiZink Center in Madrid, Spain.

Performances

Appearing
 David Broncano — off-stage interviewer
 Bely Basarte & David Rees — pre-taped performance of a medley of nominated songs
 María Escoté & Palomo Spain — presented New Artist of the Year and Tour of the Year
 Leiva — guest drummer during Dani Martín's performance
 Juana Acosta & Miguel Bernardeau — presented International Video of the Year and Best Latin Artist
 Eleni Foureira & Axel — presented LOS40 Global Show Award and Video of the Year
 Vanesa Martín & Lydia Bosch — presented International New Artist of the Year and Album of the Year
 Rosalía & Brays Efe — presented International Artist of the Year and Artist of the Year
 Aitana & Ana Guerra — presented International Album of the Year
 Lara Álvarez & Álvaro Soler — presented International Song of the Year
 Irene Montalà & Álvaro Rico — presented Song of the Year

Awards and nominations
Nominations were announced on September 13, 2018.
Artist of the Year
 Pablo Alborán
 Dani Martín
 Melendi
 Pablo López
 Álvaro Soler

New Artist of the Year
 Reyko
 Dani Fernández
 Aitana & Ana Guerra
 Maico
 Brisa Fenoy

Album of the Year
 Pablo Alborán - Prometo
 David Otero - 1980
 Dani Martín - Grandes éxitos y pequeños desastres
 Melendi - Ahora
 Pablo López - Camino, fuego y libertad

Song of the Year
 Pablo López - El patio
 Leiva - La llamada
 Pablo Alborán - No vaya a ser
 Aitana & Ana Guerra - Lo malo
 Malú - Invisible

Video of the Year
 Pablo Alborán - No vaya a ser
 Melendi feat. Alejandro Sanz - Déjala que baile
 Pablo López - El patio
 Blas Cantó - Él no soy yo
 Álvaro Soler - La cintura

International Artist of the Year
 Ed Sheeran
 Shawn Mendes
 Dua Lipa
 Bruno Mars
 Selena Gomez

International New Artist of the Year
 Liam Payne
 Tom Walker
 Post Malone
 Marshmello
 Anne-Marie

International Album of the Year
 Shawn Mendes - Shawn Mendes
 Charlie Puth - Voicenotes
 Camila Cabello - Camila
 Dua Lipa - Dua Lipa
 Post Malone - Beerbongs & Bentleys

International Song of the Year
 Ed Sheeran & Beyoncé - Perfect
 Calvin Harris & Dua Lipa - One Kiss
 Zayn feat. Sia - Dusk Till Dawn
 Dua Lipa - New Rules
 Camila Cabello - Havana

International Video of the Year
 Dua Lipa - New Rules
 Nicky Jam & J Balvin - X
 David Guetta feat. Sia - Flames
 Liam Payne feat. J Balvin - Familiar
 The Carters - Apeshit

Best Latin Artist
 J Balvin
 Morat
 Maluma
 Daddy Yankee
 Nicky Jam

Tour of the Year
 Pablo Alborán - Tour Prometo
Dani Martín - Gira Grandes éxitos y pequeños desastres
 Melendi - Ahora Tour
 Pablo López - Tour Santa Libertad
 Shakira - El Dorado World Tour

Golden Music Awards
 David Guetta
 Luz Casal
 David Bisbal
 Melendi

LOS40 Global Show Award
 Daddy Yankee - Dura
 Maluma - Corazón
 Nicky Jam & J Balvin - X
 Reik feat. Ozuna & Wisin - Me niego
 Piso 21 - La vida sin ti

References

Los Premios 40 Principales
2018 music awards